Zee Music Co. (ZMC) is an Indian music company, a subsidiary of Zee Entertainment Enterprises. It carries its business activities mainly from New Delhi. The company has captured a major chunk of market share in Bollywood music in a short span of time.

History 
Zee Entertainment Enterprises had originally ventured into music distribution with Zee Records. Its first movie was Gadar: Ek Prem Katha. Later Zee Records Home Video was established. During the launch of the company in 2014, Punit Goenka, CEO and Managing Director of Zee Entertainment Enterprises, the parent company of Zee Music Company said- " the music industry is a large playing field and there is scope to explore the opportunity in this market. Technology has also emerged as a key transformer of the music industry and digital revenues are driving growth in the market. Since we are a content company, it is essential to own intellectual property as content is the king."

Since then, it has entered stiff competition against T-Series. The journey began with Hawaa Hawaai and since then, it has extended itself to various reprise and acoustic cover versions of its own songs. Some of its most successful music rights deals include those with Fox Star Studios, UTV Software Communications, Balaji Motion Pictures, Excel Entertainment, Viacom 18 Motion Pictures and Bhansali Productions.

In 2018, Zee Music Company and another music label Sony Music India decided to have negotiations of merging companies still by the name of Zee Music Company. They would take the rights of half of the Dharma Productions and other studios' movie music rights.

Soundtracks under acquisition

Hindi 
Some of the company's most popular Bollywood albums include:

1989 (T-Series Rewind) 
Maine Pyar Kiya 
ChaalBaaz

1994 (Zee Music Rewind) 

 Yaraana

1996 (Zee Music Rewind) 

 Fareb
 Dushman Duniya Ka

1997 (Zee Music Rewind) 
Pardes

1999 (Zee Music Rewind) 
Taal
Hum Saath Saath Hain
Kaala Samrajya

2000 (Zee Music Rewind) 
 Khiladi 420

2001 (Zee Music Rewind) 
 Gadar: Ek Prem Katha
 One 2 Ka 4
 Aks

2003 (Zee Music Rewind) 
 Kuch Naa Kaho
 Chori Chori
 Waisa Bhi Hota Hai Part II

2004 (Zee Music Rewind) 
 Kyun! Ho Gaya Na... (shared with Tips Music)

2005 (Zee Music Rewind) 
 No Entry
 Parineeta

2006 (Zee Music Rewind) 
Vivah
Shaadi Se Pehle

2009 (Zee Music Rewind) 
 Little Zizou
Love Aaj Kal
3 Idiots

2014 
 One By Two (Rewind)
 Hawaa Hawaai
 Holiday: A Soldier Is Never Off Duty
 Humshakals
 Mary Kom
 Bang Bang!
 Sonali Cable
 The Shaukeens
Manjunath
Machhli Jal Ki Rani Hai
Chal Bhaag
Amit Sahni Ki List
Trip to Bhangarh
Meinu Ek Ladki Chaahiye
Desi Kattey
Mumbai 125 KM
Tamanchey
Spark
Super Nani
Colours of Passion
Titoo MBA
Zed Plus
Bhopal: A Prayer for Rain
Badlapur Boys
Main Aur Mr. Riight
Life Mein Twist Hai
Ugly

2015 
 Gabbar Is Back
 Piku
 Bombay Velvet
 ABCD 2
 Baahubali: The Beginning
 Drishyam
 Wedding Pullav
 Katti Batti
 Singh is Bling
 Jazbaa
 Pyaar Ka Punchnama 2
 Shaandaar
 Mumbai Can Dance Saala
 Take It Easy
 Sharafat Gayi Tel Lene
 Jai Jawan Jai Kisan
 Monsoon
 Dirty Politics
 Badmashiyaan
 Luv... Phir Kabhie
 Hunterrr
 Ranbanka
 Thoda Lutf Thoda Ishq
 Love Exchange (film)

2016 
 Great Grand Masti
 Kyaa Kool Hain Hum 3
 Ghayal Once Again
 Fitoor
 Tere Bin Laden: Dead or Alive
 Udta Punjab
 Bezubaan
 A Flying Jatt
 Santa Banta Pvt Ltd
 Rustom
 Baar Baar Dekho
 Rock On 2
 Dangal
 Ek Kahani Julie Ki

2017 

 Raees
 Trapped
 Baahubali 2: The Conclusion
 Half Girlfriend
 Behen Hogi Teri
 Bareilly Ki Barfi
 Secret Superstar
 Rukh
 Shaadi Mein Zaroor Aana
 Qarib Qarib Singlle
 Firangi
 Fukrey Returns
 Dekho Na
 Tujhko Sochoon

2018 
1921
Kaalakaandi
Nirdosh
Pad Man
Aiyaary
Pari: Not a Fairytale
3 Storeys
October
Raazi
High Jack
Parmanu: The Story of Pokhran
Bioscopewala
Veere Di Wedding
Teri Bhabhi Hai Pagle
Dhadak
Mulk
Brij Mohan Amar Rahe!
Gold
Paltan
Laila Majnu
Manto
Pataakha
Andhadhun
Kaashi in Search of Ganga
Jack and Dil
Mohalla Assi
Hotel Milan
Bhaiaji Superhit
Kedarnath
PK Lele A Salesman

2019 
 Uri: The Surgical Strike
 Battalion 609
 Bombairiya
 Thackeray
 Manikarnika: The Queen of Jhansi
 Gully Boy
 Hum Chaar
 Sonchiriya
 Badla
 Milan Talkies
 Kesari
 Mard Ko Dard Nahi Hota
 Gone Kesh
 The Tashkent Files
 Blank
 Kalank
 Setters
 Student of the Year 2
 Article 15
 Super 30
 Family of Thakurganj
 Jhootha Kahin Ka
 Judgementall Hai Kya
 Jabariya Jodi
 Mission Mangal
 Dream Girl
 Intezaar Mein
 Prassthanam
 Pal Pal Dil Ke Paas
 The Zoya Factor
 The Sky Is Pink
 P Se Pyaar F Se Faraar
 Ghost
 Saand Ki Aankh
 Drive
 Motichoor Chaknachoor
 Dolly Kitty Aur Woh Chamakte Sitare
Commando 3
Hotel Mumbai
 Panipat
 Good Newwz

2020 
Chhapaak
 Jawaani Jaaneman
Hacked
Shikara
Bhoot – Part One: The Haunted Ship
Guns of Banaras
Doordarshan
O Pushpa I Hate Tears
Kaamyaab
Gulabo Sitabo
Virgin Bhanupriya
Shakuntala Devi
Raat Akeli Hai
Gunjan Saxena: The Kargil Girl
Khuda Haafiz
Khaali Peeli
Taish
Laxmii
Suraj Pe Mangal Bhari
Coolie No. 1
Shakeela

2021 
The Power
Mera Fauji Calling
The Girl on the Train
The Big Bull
Hello Charlie
Hum Bhi Akele Tum Bhi Akele
Radhe
Shaadisthan
Toofaan
14 Phere
Chehre
Helmet
Rashmi Rocket
Sanak
Bhavai
Babloo Bachelor
Hum Do Hamare Do
Squad
Dhamaka
Antim: The Final Truth
Bob Biswas
Velle
83

2022 
36 Farmhouse
Looop Lapeta
Badhaai Do
Love Hostel
The Kashmir Files
Sharmaji Namkeen
Attack
Dasvi 
Major
Ardh
Nikamma
Rashtra Kavach Om
Khuda Haafiz: Chapter 2 – Agni Pariksha
Good Luck Jerry
Darlings
Raksha Bandhan
Cuttputlli
Saroj Ka Rishta
Ishq Pashmina
Babli Bouncer
Goodbye
Doctor G
Ram Setu
Phone Bhoot
Mili
Uunchai
Rocket Gang
Bhediya
Salaam Venky
Blurr

2023
 Chhatriwali
 Mission Majnu
 Almost Pyaar with DJ Mohabbat
 Lost
 Mrs Chatterjee Vs Norway

Bhojpuri 
Some of the Bhojpuri cinema albums include:-
 Dabang Sarkar (2018)

Bengali 
Some of the Bangla cinema albums include:
 Chaamp (2017)
 Dekh Kemon Lage (2017)
 Cockpit (2017)
 Maacher Jhol (2017)
 Shrestha Bangali (2017)
 Samantaral (2017)
 Mayurakshi (2017)
 Aami Joy Chatterjee (2018)
 Shonar Pahar (2018)
 Kaya (2018)
 Rainbow Jelly (2018)
 Maati (2018)
 Babli (2018)
 Aatwaja (2018)
 Abar Basanta Bilap (2018)
 Oskar (2018)
 Tobuo Basanta (2018)
 Uronchondi (2018)
 Hoichoi Unlimited (2018)
 Bhagshesh (2018)
 Kusumitar Gappo (2019)
 Dwikhondito (2019)
 Lime N Light (2019)
 Chinno Bhinno (2019)
 Char A 420 (2019)
 Dadagiri (2019)
 Brihonnola (2019)
 Samsara (2019)
 Dotara (2019)
 Shantilal O Projapoti Rohoshyo (2019)
 Password (2019)
 Ahaa Re (2019)
 Sanjhbati (2019)
 Neemphul (2020)
 Mukhosh (2020)
 Ebhabei Golpo Hok (2020)
 Bidrohini (2020)
 Jio Jamai (2020)
 Sleelatahanir Pore (2021)
 Tonic (2021)
 Kolkatar Harry (2022)
 Pratham Barer Pratham Dekha (2022)
 Paka Dekha (2022)
 Boudi Canteen (2022)

Odia

Some of the Odia cinema albums include-
 Bobal Toka(2019)
 Chirkut(2019)
 Premare Rakichhi sahe ru sahe(2019)
 Nimki (2019 film) (2019)
 Jibanara chalapathe(2018)
 Pyara Alaga Prakara (2018)
 Premi Diwana (2018)
 4 Idiots (2018)
 Shakti (2018)
 Tu Mo Hero (2017)

Telugu
Some of the Tollywood albums include:
 Bruce Lee - The Fighter (2015)
 Thanu Nenu (2015)
 Soukhyam (2015)
 Brahmotsavam (2016)
 Aaradugula Bullet (2017)
 Goutham Nanda (2017)
 Spyder (2017)
 Aravinda Sametha Veera Raghava (2018)
 iSmart Shankar (2019)
 Raja Raja Chora (2021)
 Republic (2021)
 Oka Chinna Family Story (2021; web series)
Bangarraju (2022)
Major (2022)
Karthikeya 2 (2022)

Tamil
Some of the Kollywood albums include:
 Yatchan (2015)
 Shivalinga (2017)
 Nibunan (2017)
 Spyder (2017)
Kolamaavu Kokila (2018)
Krishnam (2019)
Goko Mako (2019)
Paris Paris (2019)
Nerkonda Paarvai (2019)
Kannum Kannum Kollaiyadithaal (2019)
Thalaivi (2021)
Veetla Vishesham (2022)

Kannada
Some of the Kannada cinema albums include:
 Haage Summane (2008)
Vismaya (2017)
Hebbuli (2017)
Raghuveera (2017)
Manasu Malligey (2017)
Kempirve (2017)
Mari Tiger (2018)
Anveshi (2018)
Days of Borapora (2018) 
Ramana Avatara (2019)

Punjabi
Some of the Punjabi cinema albums include:
 Aa Gaye Munde U.K. De (2014)
 Super Singh (2017)
 Hard Kaur (2017)
 Jindari (2018)
 Kala Shah Kala (2019)
 Band Vaaje (2019)
 Jind Jaan (2019)
 Shadaa (2019)
 Surkhi Bindi (2019)
 Nikka Zaildar 3 (2019)
 Desi Rockstar 3 (2019)

Malayalam
Some of the Malayalam cinema albums include:
Diwanjimoola Grand Prix (2018)
Neeli (2018)
Mohanlal (2018)
Mangalyam Thanthunanena (2018)
Padayottam (2018)
Kodathi Samaksham Balan Vakeel (2019)
Madhura Raja (2019)
Zam Zam (2019)
Rakshapurushan (2019)

Marathi
Some of the Marathi cinema albums include:
(2010) (Rewind)
Natarang
(2014)
Natee
Rakhandaar
Punha Gondhal Punha Mujara
Aashiyana
Miss Match
Premasathi Coming Suun
Avatarachi Goshta
(2016)
Sairat
(2017)
Faster Fene
(2018)
Farzand (2018)
(2019)
Hirkani (2019)
Triple Seat (2019)
(2021)
Jhimma (2021)

Pakistani films
Urdu (Pakistan)
Some of the Pakistani cinema albums include:
Load Wedding (2018)

Controversy 
Sonu Nigam alleged that he was banned by the Zee Network after he tweeted in support of politician Dr. Kumar Vishwas.

References

Zee Entertainment Enterprises
Indian record labels
Indian music record labels
Music-related YouTube channels
2014 establishments in Maharashtra
Indian companies established in 2014
Record labels established in 2014
YouTube channels launched in 2014